V. M. Gupte is a former Indian cricket umpire. He stood in two ODI games in 1999.

See also
 List of One Day International cricket umpires

References

Year of birth missing (living people)
Living people
Indian One Day International cricket umpires
Place of birth missing (living people)